Pillai, meaning Prince, is a title of nobility which can either refer to a ruling chief, members of the nobility, or junior princes of the royal family historically ranked immediately below the king. The oldest lineages of Pillais include not only Kshatriyas   but also brahmins who took up the sword. From the early modern period, the title also came to be bestowed upon Savarna subjects by the King of Travancore for services military or political, most of whom were of Nair origin.

Etymology and Origin of the title
According to epigraphic records, it is an ancient title that goes back to the Sangam Era, given to junior members of the royal family. Originally a title meaning "royal child", it came to be given to administrators of temples; often holding large estates on behalf of the latter.

Early English records also address these hereditary ruling chiefs as the princes of Kerala ranking below the monarch. The most well known are the Pillais of the Eight Noble Houses, the Ettuveettil Pillamar of Travancore.

Changing power of the Pillais

Originally, they were royalty related to one another from amongst the swaroopams of Travancore and in course of time some of these families became extinct or were superseded by the elite families of their large Nayar retainers.  After the arrival of the refugee princes of Northern Malabar fleeing the invasion of Tippu Sultan, this practice was minimised  and the refugee princes were raised to the status of Koyi Thampuran and granted estates belonging to these deposed Chiefs.

Their absolute powers declined since the seizure of power and the creation of the state of Travancore under royal authority by King Marthanda Varma in the 1750s. The consolidation of Travancore was effected at the expense of the power of the ruling chiefs. Marthanda Varma also awarded the forfeited estates to new owners like in the case of Kilimanoor and also went on to create new titles to reward his friends and allies for military or political service rendered.

The Pillais of Kerala had authority over their own regions and right of judgment in provincial disputes, as delegated by the king. They collected fines and taxes and in return received a share of the income they collected. In wartime they led the king's armies. Some desoms were grouped together under a Prince into larger units that represented earlier independent kingdoms. Many Pillais originally functioned essentially as royal governors.
They would later do the same with other kings of whom they disapproved. in 1891, the Malayali Memorial, a memorandum signed by more than 10,000 people including Muslims and Christians, was submitted to the Maharaja Maharaja Sree Moolam Thirunal by the barrister, Parameswaran Pillai on behalf of the people of Kerala demanding administrative reforms primarily better representation of the former ruling castes of Kerala in the new administrative machinery of the state.

In 1948, shortly after Indian Independence and Travancore's accession to the Indian Union, a people's government was formed by the State Congress party under Thanu Pillai, who had for over two decades agitated for responsible government. One of the first modifications they made to the erstwhile Government House and Secretariat was to install a statue of Velu Thampi in the forecourt.

Pillais, land and titles
Despite the changes in political power, a loose connection between Pillais and desoms remained for a long time after authority had moved over to the peishcars (ones who assumed responsibility of the collector/magistrate/police superintendent) and proverticars (village officers). An official defining characteristic of a Pillai still consisted of the receipt of the revenues of justice of a desom, that later became a fixed sum. Many still held large estates that were absolute tax-free freeholds.

Forms of address
The Ruling Chiefs before the formation of the state of Travancore by Marthanda Varma are known by their family names and those elevated by Marthanda Varma or after use the title as a suffix to their given name. A Pillai (plural Pillamar) has the title Pillai of [X] when the title originates from a placename and Pillai is added as a suffix when the title comes from descent. In either case, he is referred to as Pillai [X].  Women can hold the latter title in their own right and her husband does not have a title (unless he has one in his own right).

The nephews of a Pillai, are entitled to use a courtesy title, usually the highest of his uncle's lesser titles (if any). The heir to a Pillaidom, and indeed any level of aristocratic peerage, is styled Senior (Mootha) Pillai of [X], and successive nephews as Junior (Elaya) Pillai of [X].

Commoners were to address the ruling Chiefs as Thampuran and Kanakku Pillais with the suffix Achan "Pillai Achan" Achan (title)

Medieval chiefs of Kerala

Some Madampis (Barons) and Naluvitans (Minor- Barons or Baronets) of South Travancore held the title of Pillai. They held their titles in perpetuity along with their family names rather than with their personal names. Their family names were derived from the areas they administered. According to Mark de Lannoy, at one time, prominent Pillais included six Nairs, a Brahmin (Pillai Idathara Potti) and a Kshatriya (Pillai Ilampel Pandarathil). The most influential among them were Vanjamutta (identified with modern day- Vanjimuttom),Cuddamon (Kandamam), Barreba and Mandacca (Mondaicaud). The Queen of Attingal (Travancore) would take husbands from among these Lords. The Padmanabhapuram Palace was constructed by a king named Iravi Pillai Iravi Varma Kulasekhara Perumal in A.D. 1601.

After Marthanda Varma's execution of 42 Chiefs, Barons and Nobles in 1730  according to a noted expert, the title was demoted and came to be granted more commonly to decorate soldiers upon payment of the "Adiyara" from the time of Maharaja Anizham Tirunal Marthanda Varma who had previously subdued the power of the Pillais of the Eight Houses Ettuveettil Pillamar and annexed their territories. This has resulted in the title being rather common rather than only among the highest echelons of Nair society in modern Kerala. The title of Pillai was then on granted to an individual for life upon payment of a fee known as "Adiyara" whose successors including women would be by courtesy titled Pillais. Inspire of this, to subdue the influence of these nobles, Marthanda Varma was to invent more new titles.

Great Officers of State
Besides these Chieftains, the Great Officers of the State Establishment until the latter half of the 19th century consisted of the Meleluttu Pillai (Accountant General), the Rayasam Pillai (Keeper of the Seal), several Rayasams and Kanakku Pillais respectively below them. These often hereditary offices of state were the highest positions below the Royal Household, being the Kaimal (Chancellor), the Kurup of Travancore (High Steward) and the Valia Sarvadhikaryakkar (Justice-General and Prime Minister).

Pandara Pillamar : Royal pages; they also formed the primary officers of the Maharajah's Bodyguard before 1730. The brigade existed till 1950 but consisted of European trained officers post 1730.

They were collectively called Karya-kars or Tura-kars.

Kanakku
The title was bestowed through a formal ceremony known as Thirumukom Pidikkuka i.e. holding the face of the King and included the payment of a fee known as Adiyara to the King. A person thus bestowed with this title now secured the honorific title of Pillai suffixed and the distinctive title of Kanakku (meaning accountant in Malayalam) prefixed to his name. However Kanakku and Pillai were never used together. E.g.: either a person, Krishnan, would be referred to as Krishnan Pillai or Kanakku, followed by his maternal uncle's name, and Krishnan. The latter style was used in royal writs and communications. During the Travancore-Mysore War the forces of Mysore under Tipu Sultan were defeated by a sudden attack under the leadership of General Kali Kutty Nair who was posthumously elevated to the dignity of Pillaidom as Kali Kutty Pillai.

They were collectively called Kanakku-Pillamar.

Notable people

 Raja Kesavadas (1745-1799), alias Kesava Pillai, Dewan of Travancore
 G. P. Pillai
 Iravikkutti Pillai
 Kesava Pillai of Kandamath
 M. K. Mackar Pillay
 N. R. Pillai descendant of the Pillais of Nagercoil Elenkath
 Nanoo Pillai
 Sreekanteswaram Padmanabha Pillai
 Pillai of Pallichal (Pallichal Pillai)
 Ettuveetil Pillamar

See also
 Nair Brigade
 Ettara Yogam
 Captivity of Nairs at Seringapatam

References

Noble titles
Titles in India